Villa Victoria is a municipality in Mexico State in Mexico. The municipality covers an area of  424.03 km².

In 2005, the municipality had a total population of 77,819.

See also
 San Agustín Altamirano, a town in the municipality

References

 
Populated places in the State of Mexico
Mazahua settlements